Douglas Richard McDermott (born January 3, 1992) is an American professional basketball player for the San Antonio Spurs of the National Basketball Association (NBA). While playing college basketball for Creighton University, he led the nation in scoring in 2013–14 and was a three-time consensus first-team All-American. He was the consensus national player of the year as a senior in 2014, and finished his college career with the fifth-most points in NCAA Division I men's basketball history. After graduating from Creighton, McDermott became automatically eligible for the 2014 NBA draft, where he was drafted 11th overall by the Denver Nuggets. He was traded to the Chicago Bulls and went on to play two and half seasons for the Bulls before being traded to the Oklahoma City Thunder in February 2017. McDermott has also played for the New York Knicks, Dallas Mavericks, and Indiana Pacers.

McDermott is the son of current Creighton coach Greg McDermott; Greg coached Doug during his college career.

High school career
McDermott was born in Grand Forks, North Dakota, where his father was an assistant coach of the University of North Dakota's men's basketball team. McDermott, a 6'7" 225-pound forward, played high school basketball at Ames High School in Ames, Iowa alongside high school All-American Harrison Barnes. Ames won 53 consecutive games during McDermott's and Barnes' junior and senior seasons and won consecutive Iowa state titles. As a senior, McDermott averaged 20.1 points and 7.8 rebounds per game and was named first team All-State.

Considered a three-star recruit by ESPN.com, McDermott was listed as the No. 28 small forward in the nation in 2010.

College career
Originally, McDermott signed a National Letter of Intent to play with Northern Iowa, but after his father moved from coaching Iowa State University to Creighton, he was released from his commitment in order to play for him in college.

As a freshman in 2010–11, McDermott averaged 14.9 points and 7.2 rebounds per game as he started all 39 games for the Bluejays. McDermott set a Missouri Valley Conference (MVC) record for points by a freshman (581) and was named conference freshman and newcomer of the year. McDermott also became the first player to earn first team all-conference honors as a freshman since Cleo Littleton of Wichita State in 1954. McDermott led the Bluejays to the 2011 College Basketball Invitational, where they made it to the best of three final series, ultimately losing to Oregon.

Prior to his sophomore season, McDermott was named to the preseason watch lists for the Wooden Award and Naismith Award.

As a sophomore, McDermott was one of five men named first team All-America for the 2011–12 season. McDermott is Creighton's first player honored by the NABC on its first-team All-America squad. McDermott also was named the Missouri Valley Conference Player of the Year, the first Creighton player since Booker Woodfox in 2009. McDermott finished his 2011–12 season averaging 22.9 points per game, a figure that ranked third nationally. His 801 points, 307 field goals, and 48.6 percent shooting accuracy from three-point range were all school records for a single season.  Creighton finished 29–6 and advanced to the Third Round (now Second Round) of the NCAA tournament. On March 26, 2012, McDermott was named a first-team AP All-American.

As a junior in 2012–13, McDermott ranked first in the nation in points scored and second in points per game. He set school records for points in a single season and in a career. He was again named a first-team All-American by the AP.

On April 25, 2013, McDermott announced he would be returning to Creighton for his senior season and would not enter the 2013 NBA Draft. That July, he relinquished his scholarship and became a walk-on for his final season at Creighton. This came about after the NCAA had granted senior guard Grant Gibbs, who had missed full seasons at both Gonzaga and Creighton with injuries, a rare sixth year of eligibility, putting Creighton over the NCAA's limit of 13 scholarships for the 2013–14 season.

On February 28, 2014, McDermott was named one of the 10 semi-finalists for Naismith College Player of the Year. On Senior Night against Providence, he scored a career-high 45 points and passed the 3,000 point threshold. McDermott was named first-team All-Big East in Creighton's first season in the league. He won the Big East Player of the Year award, as well as earning First-Team All-American honors by U.S. Basketball Writers Association for the third time. McDermott was also the consensus national player of the year, winning all major awards (Wooden, Naismith, AP, NABC, USBWA, and Sporting News).

McDermott led the nation in scoring at 26.7 points per game. At the end of his college career, he ranked fifth on the all-time NCAA Division I scoring list, with 3,150 points, which passed basketball Hall of Famer Larry Bird. He became the first player in 29 years to be named to the AP All-America first team three times. McDermott is one of three players in NCAA men's basketball history to record 3,000 points and 1,000 rebounds. He also set an NCAA record by scoring in double figures in 135 games.

Professional career

Chicago Bulls (2014–2017)

2014–15 season
On June 26, 2014, McDermott was selected in the first round with the 11th overall pick in the 2014 NBA draft by the Denver Nuggets. He was later traded to the Chicago Bulls on draft night, along with Anthony Randolph, for both of Chicago's 2014 first round picks (Jusuf Nurkic 16th and Gary Harris 19th) and a future second-round pick. On July 22, 2014, he signed his rookie scale contract with the Bulls after averaging 18.0 points, 4.0 rebounds and 2.8 assists per game during the 2014 NBA Summer League. In his NBA debut on October 29, he recorded 12 points, 5 rebounds, 2 assists and 1 steal in a 104–80 win over the New York Knicks. While expected to contribute with scoring and shooting for the Bulls, McDermott struggled significantly over his first 17 games, averaging just 3.2 points on 42.3 percent shooting. Despite his promising debut, McDermott did not manage to eclipse 12 points before being ruled out indefinitely on December 1 due to a knee injury. He subsequently required an arthroscopic procedure on his right knee which took place on December 13. He returned to action on January 22, 2015, against the San Antonio Spurs, recording no stats in two minutes of action. On March 6, he scored a season-high 16 points in a loss to the Indiana Pacers.

2015–16 season
In July 2015, McDermott re-joined the Bulls for the 2015 NBA Summer League, where he averaged 18.8 points and 4.4 rebounds in five games, impressing new head coach Fred Hoiberg. On October 30, the Bulls exercised their third-year team option on McDermott's rookie scale contract, extending the contract through the 2016–17 season.

McDermott's Summer League form carried over into the regular season, with Hoiberg giving him plenty of game time off the bench. Over the first three games of the season, he averaged 7.3 points per game, boosting that number up to 10.2 over the first five games with 12 points scored against the Orlando Magic on November 1 and 17 points scored against the Charlotte Hornets on November 3. His impressive play off the bench earned him his first career starting assignment on November 5 against the Oklahoma City Thunder. In 23 minutes of action as the starting small forward, he scored nine points in a 104–98 win over the Thunder. Four days later, he scored a then career-high 18 points in a 111–88 win over the Philadelphia 76ers. On November 16, Tony Snell was reinserted into the starting line-up, moving McDermott back to a bench role. On February 19, 2016, he scored a career-high 30 points off the bench in a 116–106 win over the Toronto Raptors. On March 14, he had his second 20+ point game of the season with a team-high 29 points off the bench in a 109–107 win over the Toronto Raptors. Three days later, he scored 25 points against the Brooklyn Nets for his third straight game with 20+ points, tying a career-high five three-pointers.

2016–17 season
On October 28, 2016, the Bulls exercised their fourth-year team option on McDermott's rookie scale contract, extending the contract through the 2017–18 season. Among other moves that offseason, the Bulls also acquired Chicago native Dwyane Wade, for whom McDermott graciously switched from No. 3 to No. 11 for the 2016–17 season. In the Bulls' second game of the season, McDermott scored a game-high 23 points off the bench in a 118–101 win over the Indiana Pacers. He received a concussion on October 31 against the Brooklyn Nets and entered concussion protocol; on November 12, he suffered another concussion against the Washington Wizards. As a result, McDermott missed the next nine games, and on December 5, he was assigned to the Windy City Bulls of the NBA Development League for conditioning. He was recalled two days later and made his return to Chicago's line-up on December 8, scoring eight points in a 95–91 win over the San Antonio Spurs. On January 7, 2017, McDermott recorded his first-career double-double, grabbing a career-high 10 rebounds to go with 17 points in a 123–118 win over the Toronto Raptors. On January 15, 2017, he scored a career-high 31 points in a 108–104 win over the Memphis Grizzlies.

Oklahoma City Thunder (2017)
On February 23, 2017, McDermott was traded, along with Taj Gibson and an unprotected 2018 second round draft pick, to the Oklahoma City Thunder in exchange for Joffrey Lauvergne, Anthony Morrow and Cameron Payne. On March 18, 2017, McDermott had his highest-scoring game with the Thunder, going 8 of 9 from the field, including 4 of 5 from three-point range, to finish with 21 points in a 110–94 win over the Sacramento Kings.

New York Knicks (2017–2018)
On September 25, 2017, McDermott was traded, along with Enes Kanter and a 2018 second-round pick, to the New York Knicks in exchange for Carmelo Anthony. In his debut for the Knicks in their season opener on October 19, 2017, McDermott scored four points on 2-for-5 shooting in a 105–84 loss to his former team, the Oklahoma City Thunder.

Dallas Mavericks (2018)
On February 8, 2018, McDermott was acquired by the Dallas Mavericks in a three-team trade that also involved the Knicks and the Denver Nuggets. In his debut for the Mavericks two days later, McDermott scored eight points in a 130–123 win over the Los Angeles Lakers. He received a qualifying offer from the Mavericks on June 27, 2018, which was later withdrawn.

Indiana Pacers (2018–2021)
On July 6, 2018, McDermott signed a 3 year, $22 million contract with the Indiana Pacers. On November 26, he scored a season-high 21 points in a 121–88 win over the Utah Jazz.

On May 1, 2021, McDermott scored a career-high tying 31 points, knocking down a season-high six 3-pointers in a 152–95 win over the Oklahoma City Thunder.

San Antonio Spurs (2021–present) 
On August 8, 2021, McDermott joined the San Antonio Spurs via a sign-and-trade deal. On March 12, 2022, he suffered a right ankle injury in a 108–119 loss to the Indiana Pacers. Four days later, it was announced that the injury was diagnosed as a grade 3 ankle sprain, sidelining McDermott for the remainder of the season.

National team career
Following the close of his freshman year at Creighton, McDermott was selected to the U.S. team sent to Riga, Latvia for the 2011 FIBA Under-19 World Championship.  McDermott started all nine matches and averaged 11.3 points per game on .501 shooting and 6.1 rebounds per contest, good for third on the team in both categories. The United States finished 7–2, good for fifth in the tournament.

On July 22, 2014, McDermott was named to the 2014 USA Select Team.

Career statistics

NBA

Regular season

|-
| style="text-align:left;"| 
| style="text-align:left;"| Chicago
| 36 || 0 || 8.9 || .402 || .317 || .667 || 1.2 || .2 || .1 || .0 || 3.0
|-
| style="text-align:left;"| 
| style="text-align:left;"| Chicago
| 81 || 4 || 23.0 || .452 || .425 || .857 || 2.4 || .7 || .2 || .1 || 9.4
|-
| style="text-align:left;"| 
| style="text-align:left;"| Chicago
| 44 || 4 || 24.5 || .445 || .373 || .881 || 3.0 || 1.0 || .3 || .1 || 10.2
|-
| style="text-align:left;"| 
| style="text-align:left;"| Oklahoma City
| 22 || 1 || 19.5 || .452 || .362 || .706 || 2.2 || .6 || .1 || .0 || 6.6
|-
| style="text-align:left;"| 
| style="text-align:left;"| New York
| 55 || 1 || 21.3 || .460 || .387 || .755 || 2.4 || .9 || .2 || .2 || 7.2
|-
| style="text-align:left;"| 
| style="text-align:left;"| Dallas
| 26 || 3 || 22.9 || .478 || .494 || .857 || 2.5 || 1.1 || .3 || .2 || 9.0
|-
| style="text-align:left;"| 
| style="text-align:left;"| Indiana
| 77 || 1 || 17.4 || .491 || .408 || .835 || 1.4 || .9 || .2 || .1 || 7.3
|-
| style="text-align:left;"| 
| style="text-align:left;"| Indiana
| 69 || 0 || 19.9 || .488 || .435 || .828 || 2.5 || 1.1 || .2 || .1 || 10.3
|-
| style="text-align:left;"| 
| style="text-align:left;"| Indiana
| 66 || 29 || 24.5 || .532 || .388 || .816 || 3.3 || 1.3 || .3 || .1 || 13.6
|-
| style="text-align:left;"| 
| style="text-align:left;"| San Antonio
| 51 || 51 || 24.0 || .462 || .422 || .784 || 2.3 || 1.3 || .3 || .1 || 11.3
|- class="sortbottom"
| style="text-align:center;" colspan="2"| Career
| 527 || 94 || 20.9 || .476 || .409 || .820 || 2.3 || .9 || .2 || .1 || 9.2

Playoffs

|-
| style="text-align:left;"| 2015
| style="text-align:left;"| Chicago
| 3 || 0 || 3.3 || .333 || .500 || 1.000 || .7 || .3 || .0 || .0 || 1.7
|-
| style="text-align:left;"| 2017
| style="text-align:left;"| Oklahoma City
| 5 || 0 || 13.2 || .500 || .538 || – || 1.0 || .2 || .2 || .2 || 5.0
|-
| style="text-align:left;"| 2019
| style="text-align:left;"| Indiana
| 3 || 0 || 9.7 || .200 || .000 || .500 || 1.7 || 1.3 || .0 || .3 || 2.0
|-
| style="text-align:left;"| 2020
| style="text-align:left;"| Indiana
| 4 || 0 || 13.5 || .267 || .200 || – || .8 || .3 || .3 || .0 || 2.5
|- class="sortbottom"
| style="text-align:center;" colspan="2"| Career
| 15 || 0 || 10.6 || .348 || .313 || .667 || 1.0 || .5 || .1 || .1 || 3.1

College

|-
| style="text-align:left;"| 2010–11
| style="text-align:left;"| Creighton
| 39 || 39 || 29.1 || .525 || .405 || .746 || 7.2 || 1.2 || .3 || .1 || 14.9
|-
| style="text-align:left;"| 2011–12
| style="text-align:left;"| Creighton
| 35 || 34 || 31.9 || .601 || .486 || .796 || 8.2 || 1.1 || .2 || .1 || 22.9
|-
| style="text-align:left;"| 2012–13
| style="text-align:left;"| Creighton
| 36 || 36 || 31.6 || .548 || .490 || .875 || 7.7 || 1.6 || .2 || .1 || 23.2
|-
| style="text-align:left;"| 2013–14
| style="text-align:left;"| Creighton
| 35 || 35 || 33.7 || .526 || .449 || .864 || 7.0 || 1.6 || .2 || .1 || 26.7
|- class="sortbottom"
| style="text-align:center;" colspan="2"| Career
| 145 || 144 || 31.5 || .550 || .458 || .831 || 7.5 || 1.3 || .2 || .1 || 21.7

See also

List of NCAA Division I men's basketball season scoring leaders
List of NCAA Division I men's basketball career scoring leaders
List of NCAA Division I men's basketball players with 2000 points and 1000 rebounds

References

External links

Creighton Bluejays bio

1992 births
Living people
All-American college men's basketball players
American men's basketball players
Ames High School alumni
Basketball players from Iowa
Basketball players from North Dakota
Chicago Bulls players
Creighton Bluejays men's basketball players
Dallas Mavericks players
Denver Nuggets draft picks
Indiana Pacers players
New York Knicks players
Oklahoma City Thunder players
San Antonio Spurs players
Small forwards
Sportspeople from Ames, Iowa
Sportspeople from Grand Forks, North Dakota